Sing to Me may refer to:

 Sing to Me (Renée Geyer album), 1985
 "Sing to Me" (Kate Miller-Heidke song), 2014